Lyamine Bougherara (born 12 January 1971) is a former Algerian football goalkeeper.

References

1971 births
Living people
Algerian footballers
Algeria international footballers
AS Aïn M'lila players
JS Kabylie players
MO Constantine players
US Chaouia players
Association football goalkeepers
Algerian Ligue Professionnelle 1 players
Algerian Ligue 2 players
Algerian football managers
AS Khroub managers
MC El Eulma managers
CRB Aïn Fakroun managers
DRB Tadjenanet managers
CA Bordj Bou Arréridj managers
JSM Skikda managers
USM Annaba managers
JS Saoura managers
AS Aïn M'lila managers
USM Bel Abbès managers
CA Batna managers
RC Relizane managers
21st-century Algerian people